Forsøl is a fishing village in Hammerfest Municipality in Troms og Finnmark county, Norway.

See also
List of villages in Finnmark

References

Hammerfest
Villages in Finnmark
Populated places of Arctic Norway